Stenomelania torulosa is a species of a freshwater snail, an aquatic gastropod mollusk in the family Thiaridae.

Distribution
India

Ecology
The pollution tolerance value is 3 (on scale 0–10; 0 is the best water quality, 10 is the worst water quality).

References

External links
 Philippi, R. A. (1842-1850). Abbildungen und Beschreibungen neuer oder wenig gekannter Conchylien unter Mithülfe meherer deutscher Conchyliologen. Cassel, T. Fischer
 Lea I. (1834). Observations on the naïades; and descriptions of new species of that, and other families. Transactions of the American Philosophical Society. (NS) 5: 23-119, pls 1-19
 Jonas, J. H. (1844). Beschreibung neuer Melanien. Zeitschrift für Malakozoologie. 1: 49-52
  Quoy J.R.C. & Gaimard J.P. (1832-1835). Voyage de découvertes de l'"Astrolabe" exécuté par ordre du Roi, pendant les années 1826-1829, sous le commandement de M. J. Dumont d'Urville. Zoologie
 Dohrn, H. (1858). Descriptions of new species of land and freshwater shells collected in Ceylon, from the collection of H. Cuming, Esq. Proceedings of the Zoological Society of London. 26(1): 133-135

Thiaridae
Gastropods described in 1789